The Ninety-fifth Amendment of the Constitution of India, officially known as The Constitution (Ninety-fifth Amendment) Act, 2009, extended the period of reservation of seats for the Scheduled Castes and Scheduled Tribes and representation of the Anglo-Indians in the Lok Sabha and the State Legislative Assemblies for another ten years, i.e. up to 26 January 2020.

Article 334 of the Constitution had originally required the reservation of elected seats to cease in 1960, but this was extended to 1970 by the 8th Amendment. The period of reservation was extended to 1980, 1990, 2000 and 2010 by the 23rd, 45th, 62nd and 79th Amendments respectively. The 95th Amendment extended the period of reservation to 2020. The period of reservation was further extended to 2030 by the 104th Amendment.

Text

The full text of Article 334 of the Constitution, after the 95th Amendment, is given below:

Proposal and enactment
The bill of The Constitution (Ninety-fifth Amendment) Act, 2009 was introduced in the Rajya Sabha on 30 July 2009 as the Constitution (One Hundred and Ninth Amendment) Bill, 2009 (Bill No. XX of 2009). It was introduced by M. Veerappa Moily, then Minister of Law and Justice, and sought to amend article 334 of the Constitution relating to reservation of seats for the Scheduled Castes and the Scheduled Tribes and special representation of the Anglo-Indian community in the House of the People and in the Legislative Assemblies of the States.

The bill was debated and passed by Rajya Sabha on 3 August. It was then debated by the Lok Sabha on 4 August 2009, and passed on the same date. The bill, after ratification by the States, received assent from then President on 18 January 2010, and was notified in The Gazette of India on 19 January 2010. The 95th Amendment came into effect on 25 January 2010.

The Act was passed in accordance with the provisions of Article 364 of the Constitution, and was formalized by more than half of the State Legislatures, as required under Clause (2) of the said article. State Legislatures that formalized the amendment are listed below: 

Assam (5 September 2009)
Mizoram (19 October 2009)
Bihar (21 December 2009)
Manipur (14 January 2010)

See also
List of amendments of the Constitution of India

References

95
2009 in India
2009 in law
Narendra Modi ministry